Alacakaya District is a district of Elazığ Province of Turkey. Its seat is the town Alacakaya. Its area is 318 km2, and its population is 5,993 (2021).

Composition
There is 1 municipality in Alacakaya District:
Alacakaya

There are 10 villages in Alacakaya District:

 Bakladamlar
 Çakmakkaya
 Çanakça
 Çataklı
 Esenlik
 Gürçubuk
 Halkalı
 İncebayır
 Kayranlı
 Yalnızdamlar

References

Districts of Elazığ Province